The Norman Aviation Nordic II is a Canadian advanced ultralight aircraft, designed by Jacques Norman and produced by Norman Aviation of Saint-Anselme, Quebec, first flying in 1986. The aircraft is supplied as a kit for amateur construction or as a complete ready-to-fly-aircraft and remained in production through 2012.

Design and development
The Nordic II was designed to comply with the Canadian ultralight rules. It features a strut-braced high-wing, a two-seats-in-side-by-side configuration enclosed cockpit with doors, fixed conventional landing gear and a single engine in tractor configuration.

The aircraft fuselage is made from welded steel tubing, with its wings made from wood and all surfaces covered in doped aircraft fabric. The wing is supported by V-struts and jury struts. The standard engines used are the  Rotax 582 two-stroke, the  Rotax 912UL or  Subaru EA four-stroke powerplants.

Construction time from the factory supplied kit is estimated at 300 hours.

Operational history
In February 2018 there were thirteen Nordic IIs on the Transport Canada Civil Aviation Register.

Specifications (Nordic II)

References

External links

1980s Canadian ultralight aircraft
Homebuilt aircraft
Single-engined tractor aircraft